Dariusz Baliszewski (14 April 1946 – 10 August 2020) was a Polish historian, journalist and writer. Author of television show "Rewizja nadzwyczajna", he was a common author of historical articles to one of the biggest Polish magazines, Wprost. He specialized in Polish 20th century history, and is known for several controversial hypotheses, like those related to the death of general Władysław Sikorski.

In 1999, for his television creativity and professionalism in work, president Aleksander Kwaśniewski awarded him: 
 Silver Cross of Merit.

References

External links
  Biography
 Page collecting articles by Baliszewski and about Baliszewski

1946 births
2020 deaths
20th-century Polish historians
20th-century Polish journalists
20th-century Polish non-fiction writers
21st-century Polish historians
21st-century Polish journalists
21st-century Polish non-fiction writers
20th-century Polish male writers
21st-century Polish male writers
Polish male non-fiction writers
Male journalists